Gabiley District is a district in the Maroodi Jeex province of Somaliland, with its capital in Gabiley.

Demographics
The broader Gabiley District has a total population of 320,430. It has been considered to be the fastest growing population district in Somaliland due to its fertile land.

The Gabiley District is inhabited by people from the Somali ethnic group. This district is wholly dominated by the Jibril Abokor and Abdalla Abokor sub divisions of the Sa'ad Musa subclan of the Habar Awal Isaaq.

Townships
The majority of the people in the district have been settled there for the last 300 years. There are more major and minor towns in Gabiley district than anywhere else in Somaliland.

Major towns:
 Allaybaday
 Arabsiyo
 Gabiley, capital of the district
 Xidhinta
 Tog Wajaale
 Kalabaydh
 geedbalaadh largest farmers district 

Minor towns:
 Agabar
 El Bardale
 Taysa 
Diingoobaale
 Geed abeera 
 ijaara
 jameeco. The first place where Gabriel Abokor lived
 Harta geele 
 Harcadaad

Agriculture
The majority of Somaliland food production is found in this region, making up to 85% of Somaliland food sources. It grows apples, oranges, bananas, crops, corn, maize, wheat, barley, beans, lemon, peas, groundnuts, potatoes, tomatoes, onions, garlic, cabbages, carrots, watermelons, papayas, and many other types of fruits and vegetables.

See also
Administrative divisions of Somaliland
Regions of Somaliland
Districts of Somaliland

References

External links
 Administrative map of Gabiley District

Districts of Somaliland
Maroodi Jeex